The 2007 NBA draft was held on June 28, 2007 at the WaMu Theatre at Madison Square Garden in New York City. It was broadcast  on television in 115 countries. In this draft, National Basketball Association (NBA) teams took turns selecting amateur U.S. college basketball players and other eligible players, including international players.

Freshman Greg Oden from the Ohio State University was drafted first overall by the Portland Trail Blazers, who won the draft lottery. However, he missed the 2007–08 season due to microfracture surgery on his right knee during the pre-season. Another freshman, Kevin Durant, was drafted second overall from the University of Texas by the Seattle SuperSonics, and went on to win the Rookie of the Year Award for the 2007–08 season. Oden and Durant became the first freshmen to be selected with the top two picks in the draft. Al Horford, the son of former NBA player Tito Horford, was drafted third by the Atlanta Hawks. Of the three top picks, Durant has been a League MVP, a two-time finals MVP and perennial All-Star whilst Horford has enjoyed a solid All-Star career.

On the night after the draft, the Seattle Supersonics traded seven-time All-Star Ray Allen along with the draft rights of the 35th pick Glen Davis to the Boston Celtics in exchange for Delonte West, Wally Szczerbiak, and the draft rights to the 5th pick, Jeff Green. The Portland Trail Blazers and the New York Knicks were also involved in a multi-player trade that sent Zach Randolph to the Knicks and Steve Francis to the Blazers. Apart from those two trades, nine further draft-day trades were announced.

The 2007 draft marked the first time three players drafted in the top 10 came from the same school: the University of Florida. Florida, the 2007 National Collegiate Athletic Association (NCAA) Basketball champion, tied the record set by the University of Connecticut in 2006 with five players selected in the first two rounds of an NBA draft. Florida joined nine other schools, including Connecticut, that had five players selected in an NBA draft, second only to UNLV, which had six players selected in the eight-round 1977 draft. Five players who competed in the 2007 NCAA Basketball National Championship Final were selected in the top 10; three players came from Florida, and two players came from the runner-up, Ohio State University. This draft also set the record number of freshmen drafted in the first round when eight freshmen were selected. Of the 60 players drafted, eight were freshmen, five were sophomores, 14 were juniors, 20 were seniors, and 13 were international players without U.S. college basketball experience. The Cleveland Cavaliers, Denver Nuggets, Indiana Pacers and Toronto Raptors all did not have a draft pick this year, although Indiana and Toronto each acquired a drafted player's rights after the draft. As of 2022, the only remaining active players from this draft are Kevin Durant, Al Horford, Mike Conley Jr., Jeff Green, and Thaddeus Young.

Draft selections

Notable undrafted players

These players were not selected in the 2007 NBA draft but have played at least one game in the NBA.

Eligibility

The basic requirements for draft eligibility are:
 All drafted players must be at least 19 years of age during the calendar year of the draft (i.e., born on or before December 31, 1988).
 Any player who is not an "international player", as defined in the Collective Bargaining Agreement (CBA), must be at least one year removed from the graduation of his high school class.

The CBA defines "international players" as players who permanently resided outside the U.S. for three years before the draft, did not complete high school in the U.S., and have never enrolled at a U.S. college or university.

The basic requirement for automatic eligibility for a U.S. player is the completion of his college eligibility. Players who meet the CBA definition of "international players" are automatically eligible if their 22nd birthday falls during or before the calendar year of the draft (i.e., born on or before December 31, 1985).

A player who is not automatically eligible must declare his eligibility for the draft by notifying the NBA offices in writing no later than 60 days before the draft. An early entry candidate is allowed to withdraw his eligibility for the draft by notifying the NBA offices in writing no later than 10 days before the draft. On June 19, 2007, NBA announced that 32 college players and 6 international players had filed as early-entry candidates for the 2007 Draft, while 46 players who had previously declared as early entry candidates had withdrawn from the draft.

Early entrants

College underclassmen
The following college basketball players successfully applied for early draft entrance.

  Arron Afflalo – G, UCLA (junior)
  Shagari Alleyne – C, Manhattan (junior)
  Corey Brewer – F, Florida (junior)
  Dwight Brewington – G, Liberty (junior)
  Wilson Chandler – F, DePaul (sophomore)
  Mike Conley Jr. – G, Ohio State (freshman)
  Daequan Cook – G, Ohio State (freshman)
  Javaris Crittenton – G, Georgia Tech (freshman)
  JamesOn Curry – G, Oklahoma State (junior)
  Glen Davis – F, LSU (junior)
  Kevin Durant – F, Texas (freshman)
  Jeff Green – F, Georgetown (junior)
  Taurean Green – G, Florida (junior)
  Spencer Hawes – C, Washington (freshman)
  Al Horford – F, Florida (junior)
  Robert Earl Johnson – F, Clinton JC (freshman)
  Kellen Lee – F, Los Angeles CC (freshman)
  Dominic McGuire – F, Fresno State (junior)
  Josh McRoberts – F, Duke (sophomore)
  Joakim Noah – F, Florida (junior)
  Greg Oden – C, Ohio State (freshman)
  Kendaris Pelton – G, Martin Methodist (junior)
  Gabe Pruitt – G, USC (junior)
  Ramon Sessions – G, Nevada (junior)
  Jason Smith – F, Colorado State (junior)
  Rodney Stuckey – G, Eastern Washington (sophomore)
  Marcus Williams – F/G, Arizona (sophomore)
  Sean Williams – F, Boston College (junior)
  Brandan Wright – F, North Carolina (freshman)
  Julian Wright – F, Kansas (sophomore)
  Nick Young – G, USC (junior)
  Thaddeus Young – F, Georgia Tech (freshman)

International players
The following international players successfully applied for early draft entrance.

  Ralfi Silva Ansaloni – C, Praia Club (Brazil)
  Stanko Barać – C, Široki Brijeg (Bosnia and Herzegovina)
  Marco Belinelli – G, Fortitudo Bologna (Italy)
  Kyrylo Fesenko – F/C, SK Cherkassy (Ukraine)
  Yi Jianlian – F, Guangdong Southern Tigers (China)
  Petteri Koponen – G, Tapiolan Honka (Finland)

Draft lottery

The first 14 picks in the draft belonged to teams that had missed the playoffs; the order was determined through a lottery. The lottery would determine the three teams that would obtain the first three picks on the draft. The remaining first-round picks and the second-round picks were assigned to teams in reverse order of their win–loss record in the previous season. On April 20, 2007, the NBA performed a tie-breaker to determine the order of the picks for teams with identical win–loss record.

The lottery was held on May 22, 2007 in Secaucus, New Jersey. The Portland Trail Blazers, who had the seventh-worst record in the previous season, won the lottery with just a 5.3% chance to win. This was the fourth time that the Blazers had the first overall draft pick and the first time that the Blazers won the draft lottery since it was introduced in 1985. The Seattle Supersonics, who had the fifth-worst record, and the Atlanta Hawks, who had the fourth-worst record, obtained the second and third pick, respectively.

Three teams who had the worst records—the Memphis Grizzlies, the Boston Celtics and the Milwaukee Bucks—obtained the fourth, fifth and sixth pick, respectively. These were the lowest possible picks they could have obtained through the lottery. The most recent draft in which the three worst teams did not receive the top three picks was in 1993.

Below were the chances for each team to get specific picks in the 2007 draft lottery, rounded to three decimal places:

Trades involving draft picks

Draft-day trades
The following trades involving drafted players were made on the day of the draft.
  Seattle acquired Wally Szczerbiak, Delonte West, the draft rights to 5th pick Jeff Green and a 2008 second-round draft pick from Boston in exchange for Ray Allen and the draft rights to 35th pick Glen Davis.
  Golden State acquired the draft rights to 8th pick Brandan Wright from Charlotte in exchange for Jason Richardson and the draft rights to 36th pick Jermareo Davidson.
  Philadelphia acquired the draft rights to 20th pick Jason Smith from Miami in exchange for the draft rights to 21st pick Daequan Cook, a 2009 second-round draft pick and cash considerations.
  Portland acquired James Jones and the draft rights to 24th pick Rudy Fernández from Phoenix in exchange for cash considerations. The trade was finalized on July 11, 2007.
  Portland acquired the draft rights to 30th pick Petteri Koponen from Philadelphia in exchange for the draft rights to 42nd pick Derrick Byars and cash considerations.
  Houston acquired the draft rights to 31st pick Carl Landry from Seattle in exchange for a 2008 second-round draft pick and cash considerations.
  Utah acquired the draft rights to 38th pick Kyrylo Fesenko from Philadelphia in exchange for the draft rights to 55th pick Herbert Hill and future draft considerations.
  Indiana acquired the draft rights to 39th pick Stanko Barać from Miami in exchange for a 2009 second-round draft pick.
  Dallas acquired the draft rights to 44th pick Reyshawn Terry from Orlando in exchange for the draft rights to 60th pick Milovan Raković.
  New York acquired Zach Randolph, Dan Dickau, Fred Jones and the draft rights to 53rd pick Demetris Nichols from Portland in exchange for Steve Francis, Channing Frye and a 2008 second-round draft pick.
  Toronto acquired the draft rights to 58th pick Giorgos Printezis from San Antonio in exchange for a 2008 second-round draft pick.

Pre-draft trades
Before the draft, the following trades were made and resulted in exchanges of draft picks between the teams.
  On October 4, 2005, Chicago acquired an option to swap 2007 first-round draft picks, a 2006 first-round draft pick, 2007 and 2009 second-round draft picks, Tim Thomas, Michael Sweetney and Jermaine Jackson from New York in exchange for Eddy Curry and Antonio Davis. The options to swap 2007 first-round draft picks were exercised, hence Chicago acquired New York's first-round draft pick and New York acquired Chicago's first-round draft pick. Chicago used the 9th pick to draft Joakim Noah and New York used the 23rd pick to draft Wilson Chandler.
  On August 22, 2006, Atlanta acquired a 2007 first-round draft pick and cash considerations from Indiana in exchange for Al Harrington and John Edwards. Atlanta used the 11th pick to draft Acie Law.
  On February 15, 2006, Detroit acquired a 2007 first-round draft pick and Kelvin Cato from Orlando in exchange for Darko Miličić and Carlos Arroyo. Detroit used the 15th pick to draft Rodney Stuckey.
  On December 19, 2006, Philadelphia acquired Denver's and Dallas' 2007 first-round draft picks, Andre Miller and Joe Smith from Denver in exchange for Allen Iverson and Ivan McFarlin. Previously, Denver acquired Dallas' 2007 first-round draft pick, Eduardo Nájera and Luis Flores on February 24, 2005 from Golden State in exchange for Rodney White and Nikoloz Tskitishvili. Earlier, Golden State acquired two future first-round draft picks, Eduardo Nájera, Christian Laettner, the draft rights to Luis Flores and Mladen Šekularac and cash considerations on August 24, 2004 from Dallas in exchange for Erick Dampier, Evan Eschmeyer, Dan Dickau and the draft rights to Steve Logan. Denver used the 21st and 30th picks to draft Daequan Cook and Petteri Koponen, respectively.
  On June 23, 2004, Charlotte acquired Toronto's 2007 first-round draft pick from Cleveland in exchange for Sasha Pavlović. Previously, Cleveland acquired a 2007 first-round draft pick and Michael Stewart on September 25, 2002 from Toronto in exchange for Lamond Murray and a 2004 second round draft pick. Charlotte used the 22nd pick to draft Jared Dudley.
  On June 28, 2006, Phoenix acquired Cleveland's 2007 first-round draft pick from Boston in exchange for Brian Grant, the draft rights to Rajon Rondo and cash considerations. Previously, Boston acquired a 2007 first-round draft pick on February 24, 2005 from Cleveland in exchange for Jiří Welsch. Phoenix used the 24th pick to draft Rudy Fernández.
  On August 19, 2005, Phoenix acquired 2006 and future first-round draft picks and Boris Diaw from Atlanta in exchange for Joe Johnson. Atlanta's 2007 first-round draft pick was top-three protected and hence the pick was not conveyed to Phoenix. Instead, Atlanta would convey their 2008 first-round draft pick to Phoenix.
  On June 28, 2005, Seattle acquired 2006 and 2007 second-round draft picks from Memphis in exchange for the draft rights to Lawrence Roberts. Seattle used the 31st pick to draft Carl Landry.
  On June 28, 2006, San Antonio acquired a 2007 second-round draft pick from Milwaukee in exchange for the draft rights to Damir Markota. San Antonio used the 33rd pick to draft Marcus Williams.
  On February 22, 2007, Dallas acquired a 2007 second-round draft pick from Atlanta in exchange for Anthony Johnson. Dallas used the 34th pick to draft Nick Fazekas.
  On February 21, 2002, Golden State acquired a 2007 second-round draft pick and Dean Garrett from Minnesota in exchange for Marc Jackson. Golden State used the 36th pick to draft Jermareo Davidson.
  On June 28, 2006, Philadelphia acquired New York's 2007 second-round draft pick, the draft rights to Rodney Carney and cash considerations from Chicago in exchange for the draft rights to Thabo Sefolosha. Previously, Chicago acquired an option to swap 2007 first-round draft picks, a 2006 first-round draft pick, 2007 and 2009 second-round draft picks, Tim Thomas, Michael Sweetney and Jermaine Jackson on October 4, 2005 from New York in exchange for Eddy Curry and Antonio Davis. Philadelphia used the 38th pick to draft Kyrylo Fesenko.
  On June 7, 2007, Miami acquired Sacramento's 2007 and Miami's 2008 second-round draft picks from Orlando as part of the hiring of Stan Van Gundy as Orlando's head coach. Previously, Orlando acquired Sacramento's second-round draft pick and DeShawn Stevenson on February 19, 2004 from Utah in exchange for Gordan Giriček. Earlier, Utah acquired 2004 and 2007 second-round draft picks and Keon Clark on August 3, 2003 from Sacramento in exchange for a 2004 second-round draft pick. Miami used the 39th pick to draft Stanko Barać.
  On October 26, 2005, the L.A. Lakers acquired a 2007 second-round draft pick from Charlotte in exchange for Jumaine Jones. The L.A. Lakers used the 40th pick to draft Sun Yue.
  On June 28, 2006, Minnesota acquired a 2007 second-round draft pick and cash considerations from Philadelphia in exchange for the draft rights to Bobby Jones. Minnesota used the 41st pick to draft Chris Richard.
  On June 28, 2006, Portland acquired 2007 and 2008 second-round draft picks and the draft rights to Alexander Johnson from Indiana in exchange for the draft rights to James White. Portland used the 42nd pick to draft Derrick Byars
  On February 14, 2005, Golden State acquired 2005 and 2007 second-round draft picks from New Jersey in exchange for Clifford Robinson. Golden State used the 46th pick to draft Stéphane Lasme.
  On July 20, 2006, Chicago acquired Denver's and Golden State's 2007 second-round draft picks and Howard Eisley from Denver in exchange for J. R. Smith. Previously, Denver acquired Golden State's 2007 second-round draft pick on June 28, 2006 from Boston in exchange for the draft rights to Leon Powe. Beforehand, Boston acquired Golden State's 2007 second-round draft pick on February 8, 2005 from Phoenix in exchange for Walter McCarty and cash considerations. Earlier, Phoenix acquired 2007 and 2009 second-round draft picks on January 3, 2005 from Golden State in exchange for Žarko Čabarkapa. Chicago used the 49th and 51st picks to draft Aaron Gray and JamesOn Curry.
  On June 28, 2006, Dallas acquired Miami's 2007 second-round draft pick from the L.A. Lakers in exchange for the draft rights to J. R. Pinnock. Previously, the L.A. Lakers acquired a 2006 first-round draft pick, a 2007 second-round draft pick, Lamar Odom, Caron Butler and Brian Grant on July 14, 2004 from Miami in exchange for Shaquille O'Neal. Dallas used the 50th pick to draft Renaldas Seibutis.
  On October 10, 1997, Portland acquired a 2007 second-round draft pick from Toronto in a three-team trade with Toronto and New York. Portland used the 52nd pick to draft Taurean Green.
  On June 28, 2006, Portland acquired a 2007 second-round draft pick and the draft rights to LaMarcus Aldridge from Chicago in exchange for the draft rights to Tyrus Thomas and Viktor Khryapa. Portland used the 53rd pick to draft Demetris Nichols.
  Hours before the start of the draft, Houston acquired the 54th pick from Orlando in exchange for cash considerations. Previously, Orlando acquired 2005 and 2007 second-round draft picks and Tony Battie on July 23, 2004 from Cleveland in exchange for Drew Gooden, Steven Hunter and Anderson Varejão. Houston used the 54th pick to draft Brad Newley.
  On February 24, 2005, Milwaukee acquired 2006 and 2007 second-round draft picks and Reece Gaines from Houston in exchange for Mike James and Zendon Hamilton. Milwaukee used the 56th pick to draft Ramon Sessions.

See also
 List of first overall NBA draft picks

References
General

 
 

Specific

External links

 2007 NBA Draft – ESPN
 2007 NBA Draft – Basketball-Reference.com
 
 2007 NBA Draft History

Draft
National Basketball Association draft
NBA draft
NBA draft
2000s in Manhattan
Basketball in New York City
Sporting events in New York City
Sports in Manhattan
Madison Square Garden